Pauline Judith Robertson-Stott (born 28 December 1968) is a retired female field hockey player from Scotland. She represented Great Britain in two consecutive Summer Olympics, starting in 1996 when she captained the team that ended up in fourth place.

References
sports-reference
UK Olympics

External links
 

1968 births
Living people
Scottish female field hockey players
Olympic field hockey players of Great Britain
British female field hockey players
Field hockey players at the 1996 Summer Olympics
Field hockey players at the 1998 Commonwealth Games
Field hockey players at the 2000 Summer Olympics
Commonwealth Games competitors for Scotland